Arturo "Ka Turing" Modesto Tolentino (September 19, 1910 – August 2, 2004) was a Filipino politician and diplomat who served as the Senate president and the Secretary of Foreign Affairs. He ran as the vice-presidential running mate of Ferdinand Marcos for the 1986 Philippine snap election. He is considered the foremost expert on Civil Law, as he took part in creating the Civil Code of the Philippines as a young esteemed congressman from June 1949 to August 1950. In addition he authored the Anti-Graft and Corrupt Practices Act in 1960.

He is also regarded as the father of the Philippine as well as international "archipelagic doctrine" for inserting the provisions into the 1982 United Nations Convention on the Law of the Sea or UNCLOS, particularly the rule on 200 nautical mile exclusive economic zones for archipelagos represented in the United Nations.

Early career
Arturo Modesto Tolentino was born in Manila of humble parentage.

As a student, Tolentino was noted for his scholarship. He was valedictorian of the Manila East High School (now Victorino Mapa High School; 1928), valedictorian (cum laude) of the University of the Philippines (UP) College of Law (1934), and a bar topnotcher (1934). He obtained the degree of Bachelor of Philosophy (cum laude) with a gold medal award from UP in 1938, and received the degrees of Master of Law (meritissimus) and Doctor of Civil Law (meritissimus) from the University of Santo Tomás.

As a debater and orator, he won seven gold medals (including the Quezon Medal) and two silver loving cups. He held the title of “Inter-Collegiate Oratorical Champion of the Philippines” in 1934. He successfully debated with American students from the University of Oregon in 1933 and from the University of Washington in 1934. In UP, he was editor-in-chief of the Philippine Collegian and a fellow of the Upsilon Sigma Phi.

Tolentino engaged in the practice of law after passing the bar in 1934, and was a recognized legal luminary.

He was a law professor in the University of the Philippines, University of Santo Tomás, University of the East, University of Manila, Arellano University, Far Eastern University, Manila Law College, Philippine Law School, San Beda College and Quezon College.

Political career

House of Representatives (1949–1957)
Tolentino was first elected as representative for Manila in 1949. He was re-elected in 1953. Shortly after his re-election, Tolentino was given the position of majority floor leader, which he held until his entry to the Senate four years later and one which, though less glamorous than that of speaker, he preferred and enjoyed.

As it was a very senior position for such a young and inexperienced politician, his son recalls that his father's reputation of toughness had earned him the respect of President Ramon Magsaysay. As he took his seat in the House of Representatives that day he glowered at the assembled members and said, “I warn you gentlemen, I was once a champion wrestler and weightlifter!”

The duties and responsibilities of majority floor leader and the reason for Tolentino's selection was explained in an article by Manuel Martinez in Tempo October 7, 1983.

“Tolentino was often involved in great intellectual battles and feared for his parliamentary prowess. That is why he was elected floor leader at a very young age.

In legislation, the majority floor leader, not the Speaker or the presiding officer, is the key man around whom the parliamentary process revolves. He is the lightning rod, the clearing house, the yeoman and work-horse and spark-plug, the whipping boy if he does not watch out, the beast of burden, and center of attention. Only the tough are chosen as floor leaders.

And so Tolentino discharged his function with awesome skill. It came to pass that there was born a saying, given as wise advice to newcomers to the House and later the Senate, where he was floor leader: ‘Neophytes should observe two things above all. First they should learn parliamentary rules by heart. Second, they should pray not to tangle with Tolentino in a floor debate!”

It was not Tolentino's intention to run for the Senate. He was confident of re-election as congressman, having been nominated by his party and already started his campaign when he was nominated for the Senate. He left the decision to his party leaders because he was unsure of which route to choose. The leaders allowed him to accept the Senate nomination.

Many of the candidates were asked to make financial contributions for their campaign expense. Tolentino did not have sufficient funds. He remembered being asked him how he managed this financial difficulties.

He said:

"I have never forgotten the generosity of Senator Oscar Ledesma who paid my contribution and will always be grateful to him. As a sign of my appreciation, I saw to it that I was with him during the division of candidates into campaign teams and strongly endorsed his policies in my speeches.”

The Nacionalista Party had a strong senatorial slate. In fact, the only casualty that might occur was thought by some leaders to be Tolentino. Their concern turned out to be unnecessary for when the returns came in, he was second behind Gil Puyat.

“Where did you get all these votes?” Amang Rodriguez, the party president would ask.

“I have a secret army,” Tolentino replied laughingly. “All over the country there are thousands of lawyers who were once my students and thousands of high school graduates who studied my text books.”

Senate (1957–1972)
On March 17, 1957, President Magsaysay took off from the airport in Cebu. He was at the height of his popularity. A few minutes later, his plane crashed into the side of the mountain. All on board, with the exception of one newspaperman were killed.

Tolentino said:

"I had been going with the President on Provincial trips because the President wanted to introduce me to party leaders and rural electorate for possible candidacy as a senator in 1957. Normally he would go to series of towns briefly speaking in one before proceeding to the next. I would start my speech immediately after he had finished, then follow him as soon as mine was over.
On this occasion however I was committed to a speaking engagement in Manila even though I had been scheduled to accompany Magsaysay. I explained my predicament to the President who was very understanding, who gave my seat to the Education Secretary then, who perished with the others on that ill fated flight."

Tolentino was elected in the Senate that year. He was re-elected in 1963 and in 1969.

Senate presidency (1966–1967)
In 1966, shortly after Ferdinand Marcos was elected president, Tolentino was elected Senate president. A year later, however, he was ousted from his position.

Tolentino said: 
"I seem to have a lot of frustrations that come along in my life without invitation. When I was Senate President, my term was for two years. But somehow I understood later that President Marcos had made an agreement with another Senator, - Senator Puyat, that after one year he (Puyat) would take my place. In other words we would split the two year term between us.

I was not aware of that arrangement. President Marcos never informed me. So, after twelve months of my term as Senate President, Puyat insisted that he take over. Naturally, I resisted and pointed out that my term had not yet expired. He kept citing an agreement, but I pointed out there was no such agreement.

At the next session of the Senate, Marcos maneuvered the other Senators to comply with this “commitment”, and voted for Puyat. As a result, I got ousted as Senate President halfway through my term of office."

Vice-presidential candidate (1986)

Tolentino was chosen by Marcos as his vice-presidential running mate for the February 7, 1986 snap election. They were against the united opposition of Corazon Aquino and Salvador Laurel. According to the National Movement for Free Elections (NAMFREL) final tally, Aquino and Laurel were consistently in the lead. The final tally showed Laurel winning by over 800,000 votes—roughly the same margin by which it showed Aquino defeating Marcos. However, according to the COMELEC tally, Tolentino won over Laurel with a margin of approximately one million votes. He was ceremonially sworn in as Vice President of the Philippines on February 16, 1986, but functionally never took office. The disputed outcome would eventually lead to the People Power Revolution which ousted Marcos and installed Aquino as a revolutionary president.

Later life

1986 coup

Tolentino then launched a coup on July 6, 1986, declaring that since Marcos was in exile, he was constitutionally the acting president of the Philippines. Marcos allies and about 100 soldiers marched to the luxurious Manila Hotel, barricading it with trucks. He was expecting massive support, but only several thousands of Marcos loyalists supported his cause. On July 8, he agreed to disperse his thousands of civilian supporters and about a hundred military backers, ending the failed coup attempt.

When the 1987 Constitution of the Philippines was overwhelmingly approved in a plebiscite, Tolentino announced he would respect the will of the people.

Return to the Senate (1992–1995)
In 1992, Tolentino successfully ran for the Senate, placing 18th under the Nationalist People's Coalition. However, his bid for re-election in 1995 was not successful, and he retired from politics.

Death and legacy

Tolentino passed away of a heart attack on the night of August 2, 2004, at the age of 93. He is buried at the Libingan ng mga Bayani.

He had seven children, as acknowledged in his last will and testament (1971): Arturo Jr., Evelyn and Annabella with Consuelo David; Bernadette, Salvador and Victorio with Constancia Conde; and Ma. Elenita with Rosita Robles.

Tolentino was once the foremost expert in civil law and persons throughout the 1960s to 1980s. The civil law volumes mainly used in the UP College of Law and other law universities are still the Commentaries and Jurisprudence on the Civil Code of the Philippines volumes by Tolentino, a series of volumes published beginning circa 1960.

Sampaloc, Manila has a sports center named after the late senator and has a public monument of Tolentino along Instruccion Street within the residential barangay in the city.

Notes

References

External links
Arturo M. Tolentino Memorial Website
Senate of the Philippines

1910 births
2004 deaths
Presidents of the Senate of the Philippines
Unofficial vice presidents of the Philippines
Majority leaders of the Senate of the Philippines
Senators of the 9th Congress of the Philippines
Senators of the 7th Congress of the Philippines
Senators of the 6th Congress of the Philippines
Senators of the 5th Congress of the Philippines
Senators of the 4th Congress of the Philippines
Candidates in the 1986 Philippine vice-presidential election
20th-century Filipino lawyers
Filipino educators
Filipino Roman Catholics
Unofficial Presidents of the Philippines
University of the Philippines alumni
University of the Philippines College of Law alumni
Nationalist People's Coalition politicians
Secretaries of Foreign Affairs of the Philippines
Members of the House of Representatives of the Philippines from Manila
Members of the House of Representatives of the Philippines from Metro Manila
Kilusang Bagong Lipunan politicians
Nacionalista Party politicians
People from Tondo, Manila
Academic staff of San Beda University
Recipients of Gawad Mabini
Burials at the Libingan ng mga Bayani
Ferdinand Marcos administration cabinet members
Majority leaders of the House of Representatives of the Philippines
University of Santo Tomas alumni
Members of the Batasang Pambansa
Tagalog people
Filipino political party founders
Philippine Collegian editors